Vintage Wine is a 1935 British comedy film directed by Henry Edwards and starring Seymour Hicks, Claire Luce, Eva Moore and Judy Gunn. The film was made at Julius Hagen's Twickenham Studios, but was released by Gaumont British Distributors which was the largest British film company at the time. The film was loosely based on a German play by Alexander Engels, which also formed the basis of the 1934 West End comedy by Ashley Dukes and Seymour Hicks.

Synopsis
The members of the Popinot family of French champagne tycoons suspect that the widowed head of the family Charles Popinot is keeping a mistress in Rome and generally living a wild life. Unbeknownst to them he has happily re-married and had a son with a much younger woman. She believes he is twenty years younger than he really is and is shocked when his relatives including his mother, grown-up sons and granddaughter arrive in Italy.

Cast
 Seymour Hicks as Charles Popinot
 Claire Luce as Nina Popinot
 Eva Moore as Josephine Popinot
 Judy Gunn as Blanche Popinot
 Miles Malleson as Henri Popinot
 Kynaston Reeves as Benedict Popinot
 Michael Shepley as Richard Emsley
 A. Bromley Davenport as Pierre
 Amy Brandon Thomas as Minor role
 Elisabeth Croft as Minor role
 Kathleen Weston as Family Member.

References

Bibliography
Low, Rachael. Filmmaking in 1930s Britain. George Allen & Unwin, 1985.
Wood, Linda. British Films, 1927–1939. British Film Institute, 1986.

External links

1935 films
1935 comedy films
Films directed by Henry Edwards
Films shot at Twickenham Film Studios
British comedy films
British films based on plays
Films set in France
Films set in Rome
British black-and-white films
1930s English-language films
1930s British films